Mansi (Clemensa) Barberis (1899–1986) was a Romanian violinist, music educator, conductor, and composer.

Life
Clemensa Barberis was born in Iaşi with Greek ancestry. She began to improvise on the piano at an early age. When an aunt transcribed one of the pieces, composer George Enescu recommended that Barberis take theory lessons. She studied with Italian professors in Iaşi and later studied violin, voice, and composition at the George Enescu Conservatory.

Barberis graduated from the Conservatory in 1922. She married a physician and had a daughter, which she left with her parents so she could continue her studies in Berlin. She returned to Romania after a year and took professional employment, but later continued her studies in Paris during three sessions, studying voice, conducting, opera, composition and orchestration. In 1936 she also studied voice briefly in Vienna with Max Reger.

Her opera were performed at the Bucharest opera and by the Opera Company of Iaşi.  Her music was also recorded and broadcast on Romanian Television (RTV).

Works
Barberis' music is strongly influenced by Romanian folk music. She wrote over one hundred art songs, symphonic music, four opera, instrumental music and choral works. Selected compositions include:
Itinerar dacic (1976) to verses by playwright Dominic Stancu
Destin de poet (1981) to verses by Mihai Eminescu
Kera Duducea (1963) opera
Apus de soare (Sunset) (1961) opera
Rondelurile rozelor (1982) song cycle to verses by Alexandru Macedonski

Barberis published an autobiography, Din zori până în amurg (From Dawn until Dusk)

References

External links
Catalog of works
Niculina Carstea - M. Barberis "Trandafir rosu" from YouTube

1899 births
1986 deaths
20th-century classical composers
Romanian classical composers
Romanian music educators
Women classical composers
Romanian people of Greek descent
Romanian people of Italian descent
Women music educators
20th-century women composers
Musicians from Iași